Body Count is a  1994 Rail shooter for the Sega Genesis. It is one of the few games that make use of the Menacer light gun and the Mega Mouse. In the U.S. the game was released on the Sega Channel.

Plot
A hostile race of aliens have invaded the planet Earth. A lone soldier takes up arms to fight against the invaders and drive them away.

Gameplay
The game plays as an arcade style shooter where the player shoots from the first person perspective. After a sufficient number of enemies have been eliminated, the player proceeds to the next area. At the end of the stage, the player must destroy a boss to move on to the next stage.

References

External links
Body Count at VG Complete

1994 video games
Menacer
Rail shooters
Light gun games
Sega Genesis games
Sega Genesis-only games
First-person shooters
Alien invasions in video games
Multiplayer and single-player video games
Video games developed in the United Kingdom